St. Jude's Church or St. Jude Church may refer to:

Australia 
St Jude's Church, Brighton, South Australia
St Jude's Church, Carlton, Melbourne
St Jude's Church, Randwick, Sydney

Canada
 Church of St. Jude (Wexford), Scarborough, Toronto

India 
St. Jude Church, Kidangoor, Kerala
 St. Jude Church, Karanakodam

Pakistan
 St. Jude's Church, Karachi, Pakistan

United Kingdom

England
 St Jude's Church, Hampstead Garden Suburb, London
 St Jude's Church, Kensington, London
 St Jude's Church, Mapperley, Nottinghamshire
 St Jude's Church, Plymouth, Devon
 St Jude's Church, Tilstone Fearnall, Cheshire
 St Jude's Church, Birmingham
 St Jude's Church, Wigan

Scotland
 St. Jude's Church, Glasgow

Wales
 St Jude's Church, Swansea

United States
 The church at the City of St. Jude in Montgomery, Alabama
 St. Jude's Episcopal Church, Monroe City, Missouri
 St. Jude Church (New York City)

See also
 St. Jude's Cathedral (disambiguation)
 St. Jude Catholic Church (disambiguation)